Dumbriguda is a village and Mandal in the Sankaram forest block of Alluri Sitharama Raju district in the state of Andhra Pradesh in India.

References 

Villages in Alluri Sitharama Raju district
Mandals in Alluri Sitharama Raju district